Clinopleura is a genus of shield-backed katydids in the family Tettigoniidae. There are at least four described species in Clinopleura.

Species
These four species belong to the genus Clinopleura:
 Clinopleura flavomarginata Scudder, 1900
 Clinopleura infuscata Caudell, 1907
 Clinopleura melanopleura (Scudder, 1876)
 Clinopleura minuta Caudell, 1907

References

Further reading

 

Tettigoniinae
Articles created by Qbugbot